Johan Anderson (born 29 September 1971 in Västerås, Sweden) is an Australian former tennis player.

Tennis career
In 1988, Anderson won the boys' singles title at the Australian Open. He also partnered Todd Woodbridge to win the Australian Open and Roland Garros junior boys doubles in 1989.  However, after playing on the men's professional tennis circuit for a short period, he decided not to pursue a professional tennis career.

Anderson is currently coaching tennis at Sydney tennis academy.

Junior Grand Slam finals

Singles: 1 (1 title)

Doubles: 3 (2 titles, 1 runner-up)

ATP Challenger and ITF Futures finals

Singles: 1 (1–0)

Doubles: 2 (2–0)

Performance timeline

Singles

References

Sources

1971 births
Living people
Australian male tennis players
Australian Open (tennis) junior champions
Australian people of Swedish descent
French Open junior champions
Naturalised citizens of Australia
Naturalised tennis players
People from Västerås
Sportsmen from New South Wales
Swedish emigrants to Australia
Tennis players from Sydney
Grand Slam (tennis) champions in boys' singles
Grand Slam (tennis) champions in boys' doubles